The men's heptathlon event  at the 2000 European Athletics Indoor Championships was held on February 26–27.

Results

References
Results

Combined events at the European Athletics Indoor Championships
Heptathlon